HMS Aisne (D22) was a 1943 or later  fleet destroyer of the Royal Navy. She was named after one of the Battles of the Aisne.

Aisne was built by Vickers-Armstrongs on the Tyne. She was launched on 12 May 1945, the first warship since VE Day, and commissioned on 20 March 1947.

Service history
Aisne joined the Home Fleet upon commission, but in 1950 she was temporarily laid-up. The following year, Aisne joined the 4th Destroyer Squadron, where she would subsequently have spells with the Home and Mediterranean Fleets. In 1953, Aisne took part in the Fleet Review at Spithead to celebrate the Coronation of HM Queen Elizabeth II.

In 1954, Aisne, as part of the 4th Destroyer Squadron, deployed to the Mediterranean, remaining there until 1955. In 1959, Aisne began a conversion to a Radar Picket, in effect extending the service life of Aisne, as well as those of the other converted ships, for just a little while longer than the rest of the class. The conversion gave her new radar, as well as the SeaCat missile system and new AA weaponry.

In 1962, Aisne joined the 7th Destroyer Squadron, and the following year joined the 23rd Escort Squadron, and subsequently the 30th Escort Squadron, deployed to the Mediterranean in 1964, before deploying to join the Far East Fleet. In 1967, Aisne deployed to the West Indies remaining there until the following year. In that same year, 1968,  Aisne was decommissioned, and was then scrapped by ship breakers Thos. W. Ward at Inverkeithing in 1970.

References

Publications
 
 

 

Battle-class destroyers of the Royal Navy
Ships built on the River Tyne
1945 ships
Cold War destroyers of the United Kingdom
Ships built by Vickers Armstrong